is a Japanese television drama series originally broadcast between 9 January and 11 December 2005, with a three-part special compilation being aired from 24 December to 25 December 2005. The 44th Taiga Drama, the original work is by Miyao Tomiko, screenplay by Kaneko Narito and starring Hideaki Takizawa.

Plot
In the Heiji Rebellion, Taira no Kiyomori defeats Minamoto no Yoshitomo. Yoshitomo flees the battle but is betrayed by his own vassal and killed in Owari province. Yoritomo (one of Yoshitomo's sons) is captured, but Kiyomori decides to spare him and banishes him to Izu. Yoshitomo's beloved concubine Tokiwa Gozen flees to Kyoto with their three children. After learning that Kiyomori has arrested her own mother, Tokiwa goes to him to plead for mercy. Kiyomori spares the lives of the children, sending the older two to temples, and brings the youngest boy, Ushiwaka, and Tokiwa into his household. Treating him as his own child, Kiyomori receives criticism of his generous behavior towards Ushiwaka, the son of his enemy. Soon, he sends Ushiwaka to the Kurama temple where he is renamed Shanao. Shanao frequently escapes the temple at night, and this behavior makes it clear that he will not enter the priesthood. After learning the true identity of his father, of his Genji lineage, and of Kiyomori's plans to move against him he bids his mother farewell and travels northeast to Oshu.

While Kiyomori starts to build a dream city and international port in Fukuhara, he also starts to work his way into the Imperial Court, eventually marrying his daughter Tokiko to the Emperor. With this new power the Heike grow fierce and unpopular with the court and people of Kyoto. Shanao, now named Yoshitsune after his rite of manhood, is living under the guardianship of Fujiwara no Hidehira and decides to join his exiled older brother Minamoto no Yoritomo and throws himself into the feud between the Heike and Genji.

Production credit
Sword fight arranger - Kunishirō Hayashi

Cast

Minamoto clan (Genji)
Hideaki Takizawa as Minamoto no Yoshitsune
Ryunosuke Kamiki as young Yoshitsune (aka Ushiwakamaru)
Kiichi Nakai as Minamoto no Yoritomo
Sosuke Ikematsu as young Yoritomo
Ken Matsudaira as Benkei
Aya Ueto as Utsubo
Ren Ôsugi as Minamoto no Yukiie
Masaya Kato as Minamoto no Yoshitomo
Izumi Inamori as Tokiwa Gozen
Satomi Ishihara as Shizuka Gozen
Eiko Koike as Tomoe Gozen
Naomi Zaizen as Hōjō Masako
Nenji Kobayashi as Hōjō Tokimasa
Noboru Kimura as Hōjō Yoshitoki
Tetsurō Tamba as Minamoto no Yorimasa
Tsubasa Imai as Nasu no Yoichi
Akira Nakao as Kajiwara Kagetoki
Shun Oguri as Kajiwara Kagesue
Junpei Kusami as Adachi Morinaga
Takashi Matsuo as Ōe no Hiromoto
Mao Noguchi as Ōhime
Yukiyoshi Ozawa as Minamoto no Yoshinaka

Taira clan (Heike)
Tetsuya Watari as Taira no Kiyomori
Keiko Matsuzaka as Taira no Tokiko, Kiyomori's wife
Masanobu Katsumura as Taira no Shigemori
Shingo Tsurumi as Taira no Munemori
Takahiro Itō as young Munemori
Shigeki Hosokawa as Taira no Shigehira
Hiroshi Abe as Taira no Tomomori
Noriko Nakagoshi as Taira no Tokuko
Toshiki Kashu as Taira no Koremori
Kotaro Koizumi as Taira no Sukemori
Maki Goto as Yoshiko
Yōko Minamikaze as Ikenozenni
Yuri Nakae as "Kenshunmon-in" Shigeko
Tadahiko Hirano as Taira no Morikuni
Binpachi Itō as Ōba Kagechika

Northern Fujiwara
Hideki Takahashi as Fujiwara no Hidehira
Ikkei Watanabe as Fujiwara no Yasuhira
Kazushige Nagashima as Fujiwara no Kunihira

Imperial family
Mikijirō Hira as Emperor Go-Shirakawa
Mari Natsuki as Tango no Tsubone
Tōru Baba as Emperor Takakura
Ichikawa Otora VII as Emperor Antoku
Masao Kusakari as Taira no Tomoyasu

Accolades
8th Nikkan Sports Drama Grand Prix
Won: Best Drama
Won: Best Actor - Hideaki Takizawa

References

Taiga drama
2005 Japanese television series debuts
2005 Japanese television series endings
Cultural depictions of Minamoto no Yoshitsune
Television shows based on Japanese novels
Television series set in the 12th century